Grzegorz Branicki z Ruszczy (c. 1534–1595) was a Polish nobleman (szlachcic).

He was Łowczy of Kraków since 1563, burgrave of Kraków since 1590 and starost of Niepołomice.

1530s births
1595 deaths
Grzegorz